The Adelson Foundation is an American private charitable foundation founded by business magnate Sheldon and Miriam Adelson. The organization is based in Los Angeles.

Background 
The foundation is divided into two branches, including the Adelson Family Foundation, which was established in 2007, and the Adelson Medical Research Foundation. The former works to strengthen the State of Israel and the Jewish people, while the latter focuses on healthcare.

Noteworthy donations of the organization include: $50 million to the Dr. Miriam and Sheldon G. Adelson Educational Campus, another $67 million in total was donated to their Medical Research Foundation, and $33 million to the Birthright Israel Foundation, and $13 million toward paying for the promotional trips to Israel, Jerusalem and the Golan Heights that the nonprofit organizes for young Jewish people.

In addition, the couple have pledged $3 million to Hebrew SeniorLife for housing facilities and a program to bring together older people and elementary-school students for education programs; $2 million to Gateways: Access to Jewish Education for programs for children with special needs; and $1 million to the Chelsea Jewish Foundation for specialized housing for patients with amyotrophic lateral sclerosis and multiple sclerosis. Those pledges will be paid over five years, and since 2007, the Adelson Family Foundation has made contributions totalling $140 million to Birthright Israel, which finances Jewish youth trips to Israel.

The Adelson Foundation gives $200 million annually to Jewish and Israeli causes, the largest by far of any existing private foundation with that aim.

The foundation funds the Maccabee Task Force, which claims to combat antisemitism on college and university campuses in the United States.

References

External links 
 

Medical and health foundations in the United States
Non-profit organizations based in Los Angeles